Agua Dulce is Spanish for freshwater, literally meaning sweet water. Agua Dulce may refer to:

Places
When used as a location name, it can refer to any of several different places:

In Mexico
Agua Dulce, Veracruz
Agua Dulce (Ramsar site), a Ramsar wetland in Sonora, Mexico

In Panama
Aguadulce, Coclé
Aguadulce District
Aguadulce Airport
Aguadulce Army Airfield

In Spain
Aguadulce, Seville
 Aguadulce, a part of Roquetas de Mar, Almería

In the United States
Agua Dulce, California
Agua Dulce, El Paso County, Texas
Agua Dulce, Nueces County, Texas

Other
Agua Dulce people, a Timucua group of northern Florida
Agua dulce, a hot beverage popular in Costa Rican cuisine
Battle of Aguadulce, in the Thousand Days War in Panama
Battle of Agua Dulce, a skirmish in the Texas War of Independence